Alpha Lupi (α Lupi, α Lup) is a blue giant star, and the brightest star in the southern constellation of Lupus. According to the Bortle Dark-Sky Scale, its apparent visual magnitude of 2.3 makes it readily visible to the naked eye even from highly light-polluted locales. It is one of the nearest supernova candidates.

Characteristics

Alpha Lupi is a giant star with a stellar classification of B1.5 III. It has about ten times the mass of the sun (~) yet is radiating 25,000 times the Sun's luminosity. The outer atmosphere has an effective temperature of 21,820 K, which gives it the blue-white glow of a B-type star. In 1956 it was identified as a Beta Cephei variable by Bernard Pagel and colleagues, which means it undergoes periodic changes in luminosity because of pulsations in the atmosphere. The variability period is 0.29585 days, or just over 7 hours, 6 minutes. The magnitude varies by about 0.05 magnitudes, or about 5% of its brightness. A 14th magnitude star situated 26" from Alpha Lupi is listed as a companion in double star catalogues.

This star is a proper motion member of the Upper Centaurus–Lupus sub-group in the Scorpius–Centaurus OB association, the nearest such co-moving association of massive stars to the Sun. This is a gravitationally unbound stellar association with an estimated age of 16–20 million years. The association is also the source of a bubble of hot gas that contains the Sun, known as the Local Bubble.

Visibility
Visible from the Southern Hemisphere for much of the year, it can also be viewed for a shorter season from the northern tropics and from parts of the northern subtropical latitudes.

Etymology

In Chinese, Kekouan , meaning Imperial Guards, refers to an asterism consisting of α Lupi, γ Lupi, δ Lupi, κ Centauri, β Lupi, λ Lupi, ε Lupi, μ Lup, π Lupi, and ο Lupi.

R. H. Allen described this star as having the Chinese name Yang Mun or Men(南門), meaning "the South Gate", in his work Star-Names and their Meanings.  In Chinese astronomy, 南門 is located in Horn mansion and consisted of α and ε Centauri. It was referred to as Yang Mun, meaning "the south Gate".  Allen also suggested that the Babylonian name for the star was "Kakkab Su-gub Gud-Elim" (Star Left Hand of the Horned Bull).

References 

Lupus (constellation)
Lupi, Alpha
Beta Cephei variables
B-type giants
Upper Centaurus Lupus
5469
129056
071860
Durchmusterung objects